The Order of the Precious Brilliant Golden Grain (Order of Chia-Ho), more simply the Order of the Golden Grain,  was an award of the Republic of China. The award consists of nine classes.

Recipients 

 Francis Aglen
 Albert I of Belgium
 William Beckett
 Léon Bourgeois
 Emily Susan Hartwell
 Frederick Maze
 Johan Wilhelm Normann Munthe
 John J. Pershing
 Westel W. Willoughby
 Sir Henry Wilson, 1st Baronet

See also 
 Order of the Double Dragon: Imperial Chinese award
 Order of Brilliant Jade: Later ROC award

External links
 Picture of 2nd class medal
 勳章 ORDERS AND DECORATIONS China 中國

Orders, decorations, and medals of the Republic of China
Awards established in 1912
1912 establishments in China
Awards disestablished in 1929
Orders of chivalry awarded to heads of state, consorts and sovereign family members